Meftah Ghazalla  (born October 3, 1977 in Libya) is a Libyan football goalkeeper. He currently plays for Al-Ittihad, and is a member of the Libya national football team.

External links 

Player profile with Photo – Sporting-heroes.net
Player profile – MTN Africa Cup of Nations 2006

1977 births
Living people
People from Tripoli, Libya
Libyan footballers
Association football goalkeepers
Libya international footballers
2006 Africa Cup of Nations players
Al-Madina SC players
Al-Ittihad Club (Tripoli) players
Libyan Premier League players